Biological cells which form bonds with a substrate and are at the same time subject to a flow can form long thin membrane cylinders called tethers. These tethers connect the adherent area of the substrate to the main body of the cell. Under physiological conditions, neutrophil tethers can extend to several micrometers.

In biochemistry, a tether is a molecule that carries one or two carbon intermediates from one active site to another. They are commonly used in lipid synthesis, gluconeogenesis, and the conversion of pyruvate into Acetyl CoA via PDH complex. Common tethers are lipoate -lysine residue complex associated with dihydrolipoyl transacetylase, which is used for carrying hydroxyethyl from hydroxyethyl TPP. This compound forms Acetyl- CoA, a convergent molecule in metabolic pathways. 

Another tether is biotin-lysine residue complex associated with pyruvate carboxylase, an enzyme which plays an important role in gluconeogenesis. It is involved in the production of oxaloacetate from pyruvate. 

One of the biological tethers used in the synthesis of fats is a β- mercaptoethylamine-pantothenate complex associated with an acyl carrier protein.

Biochemistry
Cell biology